Claude Hayden Buckley (May 7, 1930 – June 29, 2013) was a former American football player and coach.

Playing career
Buckley played college football as a quarterback at Ohio Wesleyan University from 1949 to 1951.  As of 2009, he still held the school record for the longest pass play at 91 yards.

Coaching career
Buckley was the head football coach at Waynesburg University in Waynesburg, Pennsylvania for 10 seasons, from 1973 until 1982, compiling a record of 52–32–3.

Head coaching record

College

References

Year of birth missing
20th-century births
2013 deaths
American football quarterbacks
Baseball shortstops
George Washington Colonials football coaches
Ohio Wesleyan Battling Bishops baseball players
Ohio Wesleyan Battling Bishops football players
Virginia Cavaliers football coaches
Waynesburg Yellow Jackets athletic directors
Waynesburg Yellow Jackets football coaches
West Virginia Mountaineers football coaches
High school football coaches in Ohio
People from Berlin Heights, Ohio
People from Stuart, Florida
People from Waynesburg, Pennsylvania
Coaches of American football from Ohio
Players of American football from Ohio
Baseball players from Ohio